Křepenice is a municipality and village in Příbram District in the Central Bohemian Region of the Czech Republic. It has about 200 inhabitants.

History
The first written mention of Křepenice is from 1045.

References

Villages in Příbram District